Sir Chhotu Ram (born Ram Richpal; 24 November 1881 – 9 January 1945) was a prominent politician in British India's Punjab Province, an ideologue of the pre-Independent India, who belonged to the Jat community and championed the interest of oppressed communities of the Indian subcontinent. For this feat, he was knighted in 1937. On the political front, he was a co-founder of the National Unionist Party which ruled the United Punjab Province in pre-independent India and kept Congress and Muslim League at bay. In 1916, he brought out a weekly newspaper named Jat Gazette, which is still being published today.

Early life
Chhotu Ram was born as Ram Richpal in a Jat family in the village of Garhi Sampla, Rohtak district, Punjab Province. His parents were Chaudhari Sukhiram Singh Ohlyan and Sarla Devi. He acquired the nickname Chhotu Ram as he was the youngest of his brothers.
He was married to a Jat girl of Village Kheri Jat, Jhajjar.

Chhotu Ram joined primary school in January 1891, passing out four years later. When he was around eleven years of age he married Giano Devi. He studied for his middle school examination in Jhajjar, 12 miles from his village, then enrolled in the Christian Mission School in Delhi. He passed his intermediate examination in 1903 and proceeded to St. Stephen's College, Delhi from where he graduated in 1905 with a distinction in Sanskrit. Parts of his education were funded by the prominent Jat philanthropist Seth Chhaju Ram.

Political activities
Among the supporters of the party at this point were such prominent urban Muslims as Abdul Qadir.
Ch. Om Parkash Kadyan, Chief Patron of Kadyan Khap International www.scoutingindia.in directed to recognize his contribution with Bharat Ratna.

Sir Chotu’s greatest act in his political career was to introduce Punjab Restitution of Mortgage Land Act whereby mortgaged land could be restituted to owner by payment of original debt without further interest, howsoever old the debt was, freeing up the landowners of Punjab from the shackles of moneylenders who could not own land but possessed it by enjoying unfair mortgagee rights.As a consequence millions of acres of land was repossessed by paying pittance sometimes decades later.He was also chief convenor of Jaat Sabha, a voice of Punjab landowners and tenants alike.

Political views 
A substantial portion of his salary as minister was set aside for scholarships and stipends for economically poor but bright students. As Punjab's Revenue Minister, he set up the Peasants' Welfare Fund. Future Nobel Prize laureate Abdus Salam was one of the beneficiaries of this Fund.

The enactment of two agrarian laws was primarily due to his contribution. These were the Punjab Relief Indebtedness Act of 1934 and the Punjab Debtor's Protection Act of 1936.

Ram died in Lahore on 9 January 1945. His body was carried back to his home in Rohtak city, where it was cremated at the Jat Heroes Memorial Anglo Sanskrit Senior Secondary School in the presence of thousands of people.

Legacy
All punjabis recognised that Chotu Ram's demise possessed profound political consequences. Farmers flocked to Rohtak to pay respects at his demise.

Monuments and memorials

Ram's place of residence in Rohtak was known as "Prem Nivas" and "Nili Kothi" (English: Blue Bungalow). The chowk (road square) nearest to his house is now known as "Chhotu Ram Chowk" and a Dharamshala exists at the same place in his name. A samadhi (tomb) was created in his memory at the school campus where he was cremated, and there people pay homage on his birthday each year.

Chhotu Ram State College of Engineering College in Murthal (Sonepat District), Haryana, is named after him (the name of the college has since been changed to Deenbandhu Chhotu Ram University of Science and Technology abbreviated as DCRUST, after it got the University Status in 2006).

Sir Chhotu Ram College of Education, Kurukshetra is named after him. Further, Sir Chhotu Ram Institute of Engineering & Technology at Meerut is also named after him.

The Indian government issued a commemorative stamp on 9 January 1995.

The Jat-Anglo Sanskrit School was started by him on 26 March 1913 in Rohtak. A Bachelor of Education college at the same campus, is also named after him.

Ch. Birender Singh, Sir Chhotu Ram's daughter's son got built a 64 feet statue by Ch. Chhotu Ram Trust - Rohtak, highest in Haryana, at his birth site, Garhi Sampla. This statue was unveiled by Prime Minister Narendra Modi on 9 October 2018.

References

Further reading
K.C.Yadav: The Crisis in India: Reflections of Sir Chhotu Ram, Haryana Historical Society, Kurukshetra, 1996
Balbir Singh: Sir Chhotu Ram in Thoughts and Deeds, Jat Samaj Sewa Trust (regd.), New Delhi, 1930
Madan Gopal: Sir Chhotu Ram: A Political Biography, B.R. Publishing Corporation, New Delhi, 1988
Madan Gopal: Sir Chhotu Ram: The Man and the Vision, Bhagirath Sewa Sansthan, Ghaziabad, 1997

External links
Harappa.com
 St. Stephen's College, Delhi, India: History

1881 births
1945 deaths
Indian Knights Bachelor
Knights Bachelor
People from Rohtak district
Indian Hindus
Rai Bahadurs
Indian independence activists from Punjab (British India)
St. Stephen's College, Delhi alumni
Speakers of the Provincial Assembly of the Punjab
Farmers' rights activists
Jat
Politicians from British India